Radio Man (or Radioman) (born 1951) is the nickname of a formerly homeless man in New York City who has become widely known from making over 100 cameo appearances in films and TV shows. His real name is Craig Castaldo (though he also goes by Craig Schwartz), but he is known as "Radio Man" due to the radio he often wears around his neck.

He has made cameos in the TV series 30 Rock and It's Always Sunny in Philadelphia and in the films The Departed, Shutter Island, Just My Luck, Romance & Cigarettes, Elf, Two Weeks Notice, Glitter, Keeping the Faith, Godzilla, Ransom, Big Daddy, Mr. Deeds, The Secret Life of Walter Mitty, The Other Woman, The Bourne Trilogy, and other films and television shows.

He is famous in New York and has been written about in The New York Times and the New York Daily News. Whoopi Goldberg took him to the Oscars as her guest one of the years she hosted.

Biography
Radio Man grew up in Brooklyn, was in the armed services, and worked for the U.S. Postal Service. He was homeless for about a year, but found a job at a newsstand in Manhattan and acquired subsidized housing in Brooklyn.   

His first cameo occurred when he was asked to move so that a shot could be filmed at his newsstand. When he refused, he ended up in the scene. He began visiting movie sets in 1989, starting with The Fisher King. He was able to locate film sets with the help of Teamsters or by finding "No Parking" signs that indicate an upcoming shoot. In the 1990s he was arrested and had a 6-month evaluation at a psychiatric hospital, but he continued to visit film sets after his release. As of 2004, he lived in Brooklyn and earned money from selling autographs as well as from his film appearances.

According to The New York Times, he is a member of the Screen Actors Guild and "knows the whos, whens and wheres of just about every film production in New York." As an actor, he typically plays homeless or disheveled-looking characters.

Documentary
A documentary film about Radio Man entitled Radioman  was released in April 2012, premiering at Toronto's Hot Docs documentary film festival. It features such stars as Tom Hanks, Robin Williams, Meryl Streep, George Clooney, Josh Brolin, Johnny Depp, Matt Damon, Ricky Gervais, James Gandolfini, Robert Downey Jr., Jude Law, Whoopi Goldberg, Helen Mirren, Tilda Swinton, Alfred Molina, Ron Howard, Shia LaBeouf, and Tina Fey talking to and about Radio Man. He was present at screenings of the film and participated in the Q&A sessions. He reportedly stated that Robin Williams was his favorite celebrity and that Martin Scorsese is his favorite director to work with.

Filmography

References

External links
Radio Man's website

1951 births
Homeless people
American male television actors
Male actors from New York City
Living people
Place of birth missing (living people)